George E. Collins (January 10, 1928 in Stuart, Iowa – November 21, 2017 in Madison, Wisconsin) was an American mathematician and computer scientist. He is the inventor of garbage collection by reference counting
and of the method of quantifier elimination by cylindrical algebraic decomposition.

He received his PhD from Cornell University in 1955. He worked at IBM, the University of Wisconsin–Madison (1966–1986) Ohio State University, RISC-Linz, Delaware University, and North Carolina State University.

Selected publications

References

1928 births
2017 deaths
People from Stuart, Iowa
20th-century American mathematicians
American computer scientists
21st-century American mathematicians